Mediator of RNA polymerase II transcription, subunit 12 homolog (S. cerevisiae), also known as MED12, is a human gene found on the X chromosome.

Clinical significance 
Mutations in MED12 are responsible for at least two different forms of X-linked dominant mental retardation, Lujan-Fryns syndrome and FG syndrome, as well as instances of prostate cancer.

Mutations in MED12 are associated with uterine leiomyomas and breast fibroepithelial tumors (e.g. fibroadenoma and phyllodes tumors).

Interactions 
MED12 has been shown to interact with:

 Calcitriol receptor,
 Cyclin-dependent kinase 8
 Estrogen receptor alpha,
 Gli3, G9a, PPARGC1A,
 MED26,
 SOX9, and
 Thyroid hormone receptor alpha.

References

Further reading

External links 
 GeneReviews/NCBI/NIH/UW entry on MED12-Related Disorders